Hagen Stamm (born 12 June 1960 in Berlin) is a former water polo player from Germany, considered to be one of Germany's best in the last twenty years, having won the bronze medal at the 1984 Summer Olympics in Los Angeles, California, and two European Championships in 1981 and 1989.

In 2000 Stamm took over the German men's team as head coach and became fifth at the 2004 Summer Olympics in Athens, Greece. Stamm is the club president of German series champion Wasserfreunde Spandau 04.

See also
 Germany men's Olympic water polo team records and statistics
 List of Olympic medalists in water polo (men)
 List of men's Olympic water polo tournament top goalscorers
 List of World Aquatics Championships medalists in water polo

External links
 

1960 births
Living people
German male water polo players
Olympic water polo players of Germany
Olympic water polo players of West Germany
Olympic bronze medalists for West Germany
Water polo players at the 1984 Summer Olympics
Water polo players at the 1988 Summer Olympics
Water polo players at the 1992 Summer Olympics
Water polo players from Berlin
Olympic medalists in water polo
Medalists at the 1984 Summer Olympics
German water polo coaches
Germany men's national water polo team coaches
Water polo coaches at the 2004 Summer Olympics
Water polo coaches at the 2008 Summer Olympics